John Cust may refer to:
 Sir John Cust, 3rd Baronet (1718–1770), British politician, Speaker of the House of Commons
 John Cust, 1st Earl Brownlow (1779–1853), British politician and peer
 John Egerton, Viscount Alford (1812–1851), British politician (born John Hume Cust)
 John Cust (footballer) (1874–1954), Scottish footballer